The term short 20th century, originally proposed by Iván Berend (Hungarian Academy of Sciences) but defined by Eric Hobsbawm, a British Marxist historian and author, refers to the period of 78 years between the years 1914 and 1991. The convention is an answer to the long nineteenth and eighteenth centuries, in which it is an attempt to use a more natural approach to historical periods. The period begins with the start of the First World War and ends with the dissolution of the Soviet Union. The chain of events represented such significant changes in world history as to redefine the era.

The First World War caused the end of the German, Ottoman, Austro-Hungarian and Russian empires. The Second World War was greatly influenced by the outcome of the First World War. The Cold War was a result of the Second World War and ended with the fall of the Soviet Union.



See also

American Century
The Age of Extremes
Long War (20th century)

References

Footnotes

Bibliography

 

1990s neologisms
20th century
Historical eras
Periodization